The 2016–17 Alaska Nanooks men's ice hockey season was the 68th season of play for the program, the 33rd at the Division I level and the 4th in the WCHA conference. The Nanooks represented the University of Alaska Fairbanks and were coached by Dallas Ferguson, in his 9th season.

Season
Alaska began the season poorly, losing four straight after opening with a win over Alaska Anchorage. The team rebounded with a win over #9 Minnesota State but could then only win two of their next eleven games. The Nanooks' offense was subpar during the first half of the season, scoring more than 3 goals in only four of their twenty games while averaging just over two and half goals per game. While the two goaltenders, Jenks and Jones, kept the team in most games, inconsistent play had led to Jenks supplanting the senior as the primary netminder in the first half of the year.

After a couple of bad outings around new year's, Jones was back in as the starter and didn't relinquish the job for the rest of the year. While the team's offense didn't get any better, the defense got stronger as they year went along and helped the team improve to 6th in the standings by the end of the season.

Entering the postseason, Alaska was hoping to continue giving Minnesota State fits, having defeated the Mavericks twice during the regular season. Unfortunately, the offense was absent from the series and the Nanooks were only able to record a single goal in two games.

Departures

Recruiting

Roster

Standings

Schedule and results

|-
!colspan=12 style=";" | Exhibition

|-
!colspan=12 style=";" | Regular Season

|-
!colspan=12 style=";" | 

|-
!colspan=12 style=";" | 

|- align="center" bgcolor="#e0e0e0"
|colspan=12|Alaska Lost Series 0–2

Scoring statistics

Goaltending statistics

Rankings

USCHO did not release a poll in Week 24.

References

2016-17
Alaska
Alaska
Alaska
Alaska